Tömük Creek (also called Karakız) is an irregular-flow creek in Turkey.
It is in Erdemli ilçe (district) of Mersin Province. The upper reaches are in Toros Mountains at  altitude. However, after the construction of Karakız Lake now it is fed by the lake  Its main course is toward south east. The creek supplies the water to the agricultural area around Tömük

References

Rivers of Turkey
Rivers of Mersin Province
Erdemli District